In Alaska: Breaking The Ice is the title for the 1984 album by El Gran Combo de Puerto Rico. The album was nominated for the 1985 Grammy Award for Best Tropical Latin Performance (the award is currently referred to as Best Tropical Latin Album).

Track listing
 "Carbonerito" - 4:59
 "Las Creencias" - 4:51
 "Amigo Mío" - 4:29
 "No Es de Pena" - 4:09
 "Amor Brutal" - 4:46
 "Azuquita Pa'l Cafe" - 4:07
 "Imaginación" - 4:54
 "La Mal Pensa" - 4:44

Charts

References

El Gran Combo de Puerto Rico albums
1984 albums